Mariano Daniel Bertolotti (born September 27, 1982 in Buenos Aires) is an Argentine judoka, who played for the lightweight category. He finished only in seventh place for his division at the 2007 Pan American Games in Rio de Janeiro, losing out to Canada's Nicholas Tritton.

Bertolotti represented Argentina at the 2008 Summer Olympics in Beijing, where he competed for the men's lightweight class (73 kg). He lost the first preliminary match, with a waza-ari (half-point), to Brazil's Leandro Guilheiro, who eventually won the bronze medal in this event.

References

External links

NBC Olympics Profile

Argentine male judoka
1982 births
Living people
Olympic judoka of Argentina
Judoka at the 2008 Summer Olympics
Sportspeople from Buenos Aires
Judoka at the 2007 Pan American Games
Pan American Games competitors for Argentina
20th-century Argentine people
21st-century Argentine people